Dolichoderus canopus is a species of ant in the genus Dolichoderus. Described by Shattuck and Marsden in 2013, only two specimens of this species have been collected, which were taken from South Australia.

References

Dolichoderus
Hymenoptera of Australia
Insects described in 2013